Regius Professor of Botany is a regius professorship at the University of Aberdeen in Scotland.

List of Regius Professors of Botany

 1860 to 1877: George Dickie
 1877 to 1919: James W. H. Trail
 1920 to 1933: William Grant Craib
 1934 to 1959: James Robert Matthews
 1959 to 1981: Paul Egerton Weatherley
 1982 to 1988: Charles Henry Gimingham
 1996 to 2010: Ian Alexander

References 

Botany, Regius
Botany, Aberdeen
Botany, Regius